Avilés is a town in Asturias, Spain. Avilés is, along with Oviedo and Gijón, one of the main cities in the Principality of Asturias.

The town occupies the flattest land in the municipality, partially in a land that belonged to the sea, surrounded by small promontories, all of them having an altitude of less than 140 metres. Situated in the Avilés estuary, in the Northern Central area of the Asturian coast, west of Peñas Cape, is its national seaport.

Avilés is mainly an industrial city. It is close to popular beaches like Salinas. It also has important churches like St. Thomas of Canterbury.
Avilés has also cultural spaces such as the Palacio Valdés Theatre or the Oscar Niemeyer International Cultural Centre.

History

Toponymy 

The existence of the town proper is documented only in the latter Early Middle Ages, although the etymology of the name "Avilés" is likely ancient. It is thought to come from a local Roman landowner  or likely a Romanized Germanic warrior who settled there from/to the Kingdom of the Suebi or Visigothic Kingdom, as much toponymy in northern Spain shares a Germanic origin  named Abilius.

Chronology 

Archaeological excavations have shown that the area was already settled in the upper palaeolithic era.

The first well known document is an endowment of two churches by Asturias King Alfonso III, in 905. During the Middle Ages, it was one of the most important ports of the Biscay Bay, trading mainly with French ports, the main trade was salt. At this time, it had two nuclei: a fishermen's district, Sabugo, and the aristocratic centre, La Villa, standing each other across a small water inlet at the site of present-day Avilés' main Park. La Villa was surrounded by strong walls, which demonstrated its strategic and commercial importance. On 15 January 1479 the Catholic Monarchs granted a free market on each Monday of the year, which still takes place. The importance of the town as a naval centre is supported by the building of ships with wood harvested from nearby forests, and with the participation of local sailors in the conquest of Seville by the Castilian army, which is reflected in Avilés's coat of arms.

It is the birthplace of Pedro Menéndez de Avilés, a soldier in the army of Felipe II, who explored Florida in the 16th century and founded in 1565 the first successful (continuously populated) European town in what is now the United States, San Agustín (now St. Augustine, Florida). St. Augustine and Avilés are now sister cities. Avilés is also the birthplace of Juan Carreño de Miranda, court painter to the king Charles II.

The estuary, which had been closed to navigation since the early modern era, was partially drained and cleared in the 19th century.  The water inlet dividing the place was covered, so that the two nuclei, Sabugo and La Villa, could be joined together. Then the city began to grow outside the medieval wall, which had been demolished in 1818. In the 20th century, there was an enormous growth in population due to the arrival of several large factories to the town. In 1953 were started the first earthworks for the construction of the factory of ENSIDESA, a large steel mill, currently Aceralia (part of ArcelorMittal); other companies in the area are Cristalería Española, which together with ENDASA, currently Alcoa, transformed Avilés into one of Spain's industrial centres. Nowadays, the city is trying to focus on new industries, particularly cultural tourism, and recover its antique flavour.

Culture

Architecture 
Sights include:
 St. Thomas of Canterbury church (dating from the 13th century)
 Church of Saint Nicholas of Bari (12th-13th century), in Romanesque style
 , the sole example of civil medieval architecture in the town
  (1700–1706)
 , fortified in its north façade against the English pirates
 , a 14th-century funerary monument in Romanesque-Gothic transition style
 Old church of Sabugo (13th century)
 , in Modernist style
 Palacio Valdés Theatre, in Neobaroque style

Museums and arts centres 
 Museum of Avilés Urban History
 Black Pottery Museum
 Alfercam Museum, where visitors can find a combination of world musical instruments and vintage cars.
 , including the Bances Candamo public library, art gallery, reading and study areas.
 CMAE -  - arts and exhibicion centre in El Arbolón area, not far from the town centre.
 Oscar Niemeyer International Cultural Centre, designed by the Brazilian architect Oscar Niemeyer. It is a magnet for different personalities, including winners of the Prince of Asturias Awards, the Nobel prize, musicians, actors, the United Nations, etc.

Sculptures 

Feasts and traditions 
Some of the most famous are:

In autumn:

In winter:

In spring:

 Lunch in the street.
The .

In summer:

 The Celsius 232, a terror, fantasy and science fiction literature festival.
 The Interceltic Festival of Avilés, which takes place in summer, with people coming from all Celtic nations (Brittany, Ireland, Wales, Scotland, Galicia, Asturias).
 Feast of Saint Augustine (Avilés' patron saint).
 rock festival.

Festivals 
 Interceltic Festival of Avilés, which takes place in summer, with people coming from all Celtic nations (Brittany, Ireland, Wales, Scotland, Galicia, Asturias).
 Avilés International Cinema and Architecture Festival
 Beer Festival
 Avilés Acción Film Festival, an international short film festival.
   organized from Sol Street.
 IndieGo Alley Festival, International Creative Commons film and music festival (live music, videoclips, experimental cinema and short films) organized in Palacio Valdés street. It takes place for one evening.

Climate 
The area experiences an oceanic climate, warm summers with both overcast and sunny days. In winter the weather is moderate, with significant rains and wind, although sometimes the cold climate of Asturias results in snowfall at sea level. Summer highs are exceptionally low by Spanish standards due its heavy maritime features and northerly position in the country.

Politics

The first mayor of Avilés, after the Spanish Transition, was Manuel Ponga Santamarta (FSA-PSOE) (1979-1983) (1983-1987) (1987-1988), then Santiago Jesús Rodríguez Vega (FSA-PSOE) (1988-1991) (1991-1995) (1999-2003) (2003-2007), Agustín Gonzalez Sánchez (PP) (1995-1999), Pilar Varela Díaz (FSA-PSOE) (2007-2011) (2011-2015), and the current one María Virtudes Monteserín Rodríguez (FSA-PSOE) (2015-2019) (2019-2023).

Economy
The Port of Avilés is a port facility in Avilés. It handles bulk, breakbulk, liquid bulk and has facilities for fishing and leisure craft.

Parishes 
Avilés
Corros
Entreviñas
Laviana
Miranda
Valliniello

Notable people 
Horacio Álvarez (1881–1936), politician, lawyer and journalist
Kily Álvarez (born 1984), footballer
Sergio Álvarez (born 1992), footballer
Iván Candela (born 1978), retired footballer
Juan Carreño de Miranda (1614–1685), painter
Yago Lamela (1977–2014), athlete
Pedro Menéndez de Avilés (1519–1574), admiral, explorer and first governor of Florida
 Esteban de las Alas, governor of Florida (in the absence of Avilés) and Santa Elena
 Juan Treviño de Guillamas (d. before 1636), governor of Spanish Florida (1613–1618) and Venezuela (1621–1623).

Sister cities 
 St. Augustine, Florida, United States
 Saint-Nazaire, France
 Laayoune, Morocco
 Cárdenas, Cuba

See also 
Iglesia de Santa Bárbara (Llaranes)

References

Bibliography 
 Paseo ilustrado por el casco histórico de Avilés, Concejalía de Turismo, Ayuntamiento de Avilés, del Río, Alberto
 Avilés, Ediciones: Mases, Ovies Ruiz, José Ramón
 Asturias a través de sus concejos, Ediciones: Prensa Asturiana S.A.
 Heráldica Institucional y Vexilología del Principado de Asturias, Ediciones: Principado de Asturias, Panizo Gómez, Eduardo
 Avilés, una historia de mil años, Ediciones Azuzel, Juan Carlos de la Madrid
 Avilés, su fe y sus obras, author's edition, Ángel Garralda García
 Gran Enciclopedia Asturiana, Silverio Cañada, Several authors

External links 

Municipality of Avilés
Avifoto - pictures of the city(requires flash)
Avilés Hall Webcam
Oscar Niemeyer International Cultural Centre

 
Municipalities in Asturias
Port cities and towns on the Spanish Atlantic coast